Oplan Paglalanse is an adventure story arc of the Philippine comic strip series Pugad Baboy, created by Pol Medina Jr. and originally published in the Philippine Daily Inquirer. This particular story arc lasts 23 strips long and ran in during the month of January 1994. In 1996, the story arc was reprinted in Pugad Baboy 7, the seventh book compilation of the comic strip series. This marks the first appearance of the Walang Payat Gang, a vigilante group formed by Utoy, Paltik, Joma, and Polgas. The Walang Payat Gang again makes an appearance in a later story arc, Kulto.

Synopsis
The officers at the Left Turn Police District's inflow of bribes are slowing down as many motorists are beginning to obey traffic rules. Patrolman Gagancho tells his colleague Patrolman Durugas that it is just the Filipino trait of ningas cogon because abiding the law may be one of the motorists' New Year's resolutions and they may later revert to their old ways. The district chief Colonel Magti then launches Oplan Paglalanse to make sure the motorists will.

Oplan Paglalanse is done as follows: Traffic lights are reprogrammed so the yellow light will not light up. One-way and two-way streets are reassigned. Parking and No Parking zones are redesignated, and so are tow-away zones. Fees in the use of pay parking areas are also hiked. All of this are done without any notice to the motorists to confuse them. This will be implemented for three months, after which when the motorists get used to the new rules, the rules are changed again.

The new "project" pays off as bribe collection is on the rise again. To add insult to injury to the motorists, Colonel Magti even tells his men that rather than buying more tow trucks, they will use wheel boots so the vehicles to be towed will not go anywhere while the tow trucks are busy.

However, the district officers are beginning to be victims of their own scheme.

Payback
One day, Patrolman Gagancho parks his jeep in front of a fire hydrant, which is not allowed. While his back is turned, his jeep is towed away to a place called Radium in the suburb of San Andres Bukid. When the tow truck leaves the jeep there, some scrupulous men take the jeep apart, leaving only its chassis.

Meanwhile, Patrolman Oonse drives the wrong way in a one-way street when he feels his jeep's tires have been punctured. He stops to see iron spikes on his jeep's path. He leaves the jeep to call for help, but when he returns, he is surprised to see wheel boots installed on his jeep's tires.

In another part of town, Patrolman Durugas is driving home drunk with his car sirens on. In fact, he is so drunk that he is not paying attention to any traffic light or intersection. From a vehicle driving behind the officer's car, a shadow (Polgas) shoots a taser pistol to the officer's car. The car's body is negatively charged, so when the positively charged taser goes into contact with the car, it electrocutes the car (driver and all) and short-circuits its electrical system in the process.

The three affected police officers report to the station to air what happened to Colonel Magti only to find out the colonel is not spared as his family car and those of his wife and eight children have been towed and impounded in several different stations. The culprit also leaves him a note, which tells him that everybody must follow the law; and that includes law "enforcers." Infuriated by the note, Colonel Magti orders his men to find and "arrange" the note's author, known only as "WPG."

One day, Patrolman Gagancho once again parks his new jeep in front of a fire hydrant and stakes out the location. Not long after, a pick-up truck laden with "balikbayan boxes" (large boxes used by Filipino migrants to send and/or bring gifts to loved ones) passes by. Patrolman Gagancho immediately apprehends the truck and talks to its driver. While he is thinking of what violation he can charge to the driver, the policeman does not sense his new jeep is being towed away. He finally proceeds to unload one box from the truck, charging the driver with overloading. But as he turns his back, he finds his jeep gone, and when he turns again, the truck has also driven off, leaving the boxes behind. When he opens the boxes, he finds, to his horror, garbage from Malacañan Palace inside.

The trickery played against the Left Turn police officers go on with success until Patrolman Durugas catches a boy (Paltik) installing wheel boots on his jeep. He starts shooting at the boy (without warning) as another (Utoy) uses a specialized Swiss army knife to shoot a capsule of liquid nitrogen on Durugas' hand. The policeman's hand is suddenly frozen to his gun. The confrontation then takes place between Durugas and a group known as "WPG" or "Walang Payat Gang" (walang payat is Filipino for "none thin") composed only of four members: Polgas, Utoy, Paltik, and Joma. However, only a question and an introduction are exchanged in that encounter.

Patrolman Durugas reports the matter to Colonel Magti, but since the colonel is "busy" reading a newspaper, he tells the patrolman to file his report. So Durugas, still with his right hand frozen in liquid nitrogen, types an action-packed, yet fictitious account of the encounter, hoping a movie producer will be interested in his life story.

The Bust
Days later, Colonel Magti calls his men to tell them of his plan to catch the WPG. Currently, their bribes are collected by jeepney barkers, dispatchers, and cigarette vendors. So the colonel sets up his plan: an honesty lane wherein the motorist will just throw money into a drum just to use the lane. The colonel is sure the WPG will confiscate the drum so Patrolman Gagancho is tasked to hide inside the drum so he can arrest the group on the spot.

So the honesty lane plan goes underway. Four days later, the WPG takes the drum away to Smokey Mountain, a garbage dump in suburban Manila. The group intends to donate the money inside to the child scavengers there. But as the group is about to give the drum of coins, Patrolman Gagancho comes out from inside the drum and takes a child hostage, forcing the WPG to surrender.

Colonel Magti, along with Patrolmen Oonse and Durugas, come to Gagancho's aid and confiscate several items from the group. Unknown to them, Utoy is still holding his Swiss army knife while his arms are still raised. He then shoots out a capsule of sodium to a spot near the base of the drum, igniting the garbage there. As Oonse is about to take Utoy's Swiss army knife, the coins and the drum become so hot Gagancho shoots out of the drum.

Suddenly, "in one fluid motion," the WPG attacks the three other police officers. Even the child scavengers join in the act with one of them hitting Patrolman Oonse with a car battery. It doesn't take long before Paltik and Utoy subdue Colonel Magti with a scissor lock. Utoy even opens the colonel's face mask to let him smell the stench of the dump. The colonel hangs tough, but after eight seconds, he finally confesses to heading the anomalous "Oplan Paglalanse." The confession is even recorded on tape by Joma.

Polgas then shows the police officers the tape which contains the confession and all the activities involved in Oplan Paglalanse and he tells the colonel that he will make copies of it and the group will expose Oplan Paglalanse if the officers keep up with the anomalous acts. Colonel Magti asks if the group will show the video to the Senate; Polgas answers that he won't because Senate inquiries don't get resolved anyway. Instead, he will show it to several media outlets, columnists, the Alex Boncayao Brigade, and even the writers of the TV show Abangan... ang Susunod na Kabanata. So the officers promise to stop Oplan Paglalanse and do their jobs.

Indeed, the officers of Left Turn Police District keep their promise to reform themselves. Even Dagul, one of Patrolman Durugas' "victims" is surprised to see the officer reminding him to buckle his seatbelt instead of asking for bribes. Truly, the police officers have become good, hardworking, and responsible law enforcers. The only thing still troubling Colonel Magti is how he will support his four wives and eighteen children.

Story teaser
When the arc was published in Pugad Baboy 7, this line about the arc is found in the back. It goes as follows:

Gluttony, greed, sloth...You name it,they're guilty of it.

They're the country's most sinful.

And they're on theright side of the law.

Under the lines, the WPG is shown facing away from the reader toward the colonel and the three officers. However, there is an error: when the group is pictured to have five members when it is clear that there are four. The reader can deduce that the mystery fifth member may be either an unlikely Bong, who never appears in the arc at all but will become a victim himself of another money laundering case the WPG investigate two books later (in Kulto) or a doppelganger for either Utoy or Paltik and Medina may just added him for symmetry in the group's formation.

Character information
The name of Patrolman Durugas, already a recurring character in the strip, is derived from the word mandurugas (one who cheats). So it is appropriate that his fellow officers Patrolmen Gagancho and Oonse's names are also derived from Filipino slang words associated with cheating and fraud (mang-oonse and mangagantso).

Colonel Magti is based on Magtanggol Gunigundo, who was chairman of the Metropolitan Manila Development Authority at the time the arc was first published.

References 

1994 in comics
Pugad Baboy